Ștefan Adrian Mardare (born 3 December 1987) is a Romanian former footballer who played as a centre-back for teams such as FCM Bacău, FC Vaslui, Rapid București or Unirea Alba Iulia, among others.

He graduated from the FCM Bacău Academy. Then he made his debut for the senior team against Rapid București at 15 years of age. Leaving Bacău after relegation, he signed for F.C. Vaslui, where he became a first team regular.

Mardare was linked to Newcastle and Everton in 2007.

In September 2013, he signed a 3-year contract with Dinamo București, but he was getting reserve football because of poor fitness level.

Honours
Debrecen
Nemzeti Bajnokság I: 2011–12
Magyar Kupa: 2011–12
Dunărea Călărași
Liga II: 2017–18

References

External links
 
 

Living people
1987 births
Sportspeople from Bacău
Romanian footballers
Romania under-21 international footballers
Association football defenders
Liga I players
Liga II players
Liga III players
Nemzeti Bajnokság I players
FCM Bacău players
FC Vaslui players
FC Rapid București players
Debreceni VSC players
ASC Oțelul Galați players
FC Dinamo București players
FC UTA Arad players
CS Național Sebiș players
CS Corvinul Hunedoara players
CSM Unirea Alba Iulia players
FC Dunărea Călărași players
CSM Reșița players
Romanian expatriate footballers
Expatriate footballers in Hungary
Romanian expatriate sportspeople in Hungary